ScoopFire was an online newspaper that debuted with a soft launch on Aug. 31, 2009.
ScoopFire started in Andover, Kansas with the goal of providing "hyperlocal" news and content, meaning it focuses on that town and that town only. It had the same coverage priorities as a local newspaper - education, business, sports, community profiles, police reports, and so on - with a website that is interactive with the reader.

Shortly after launching, ScoopFire ran a seven-part series celebrating the 25th anniversary of Andover High School's 1984 state football championship. Other highlights in ScoopFire's short history include its coverage of Andover's controversial trash and recycling ordinance, the budget crisis and teacher layoffs facing Andover public schools and a series called "Keeping Business Local."

ScoopFire was known for directly downloading PDFs of fliers that promoted Andover non-profit organizations and community events for its readers. Every Monday, it directly downloaded a PDF of Andover's weekly police report as a community service.

Owner 
ScoopFire's Owner, Editor and Director of Operations was Adam Knapp, whose career includes an 11-year run as a sportswriter for The Wichita Eagle (1996–2007), in which he won three national awards from the Associated Press Sports Editors. A Wichita State University graduate, Knapp has also worked for The Arkansas City Traveler (1992–93), St. Joseph News-Press (1994–96) and The Wichita Business Journal (2007–08).

History 

Knapp was unsuccessful in his attempt to have ScoopFire became the first online-only member of the Kansas Press Association. 

In 2010, ScoopFire became media partners with KWCH Eyewitness News in Wichita. The two media outlets began sharing news and feature stories from Andover, and Knapp started to office out of the KWCH newsroom.

Knapp then sold ScoopFire to New York-based Gatehouse Publications, whose management wanted Knapp to help them start a print newspaper in Andover. In January 2011, Knapp became the first editor of the Andover American. In the American's first year of existence, it won first place in five difference categories (for business, government/political, editorial, sports features and overall feature story) from the Kansas Press Association's "Awards of Excellence." The American also picked up three second-place awards from the KPA.

References

External links 
ScoopFire/Andover American website

Defunct newspapers published in Kansas
2009 establishments in Kansas
Internet properties established in 2009